Colin Bell (born 17 February 1979 in Poudre d'Or) is a Mauritian footballer who plays for Pamplemousses SC in the Mauritian League and internationally for the Mauritius national football team.

Career

Senior career
Bell started his professional career with local club Poudre d'Or ATC. In 2003, he moved to Faucon Flacq SC of the Mauritian League. In 2006, he transferred to Pamplemousses SC, also of the Mauritian league. He soon became team captain, and has been an integral part of the team ever since.

International career
Bell received his first cap for Mauritius in 2006. Since then, he has amassed a total of 20 caps, and has become captain for Club M.

References

External links

1979 births
Living people
People from Flacq District
Mauritian footballers
Mauritius international footballers
Pamplemousses SC players
Association football midfielders
Mauritian Premier League players